The 2020 NRL season was the 113th  of professional rugby league in Australia and the 23rd season run by the National Rugby League.

As of 3 May 2020, the season was shortened from 25 rounds to 20, and the finals series and State of Origin pushed back, due to the COVID-19 pandemic. The first two rounds were played before the season was suspended on 23 March, and premiership points earned from the earlier rounds are still counted. The season resumed on 28 May.
After playing the first two rounds with 2 referees, the decision was made to play the remaining rounds with one referee. To accommodate this, a number of other rules changes were introduced.

Regular season 
All times are in AEDT (UTC+11:00) up until the 5th of April and AEST (UTC+10:00) from then on.

Round 1

Round 2

Round 3

 All matches held this round included a minute's silence following the passing of league legend Arthur Summons.

Round 4

The Sydney Roosters handed the Brisbane Broncos their biggest ever loss and the Broncos were held scoreless at Suncorp Stadium for the first time in their history. It was also the Roosters' biggest win since round 6, 1996.

Round 5

Manly recovered from an 0–18 deficit just prior to halftime
Crowds were permitted back in stadiums, albeit in limit numbers in corporate boxes only.
The Bulldogs vs Roosters clash was postponed due to one of the player's children attending a school where someone tested positive to COVID-19. The Dragons vs Sharks game was shifted to start at 4:05pm as opposed to their original 6:30pm timeslot.

Round 6 

Stephen Kearney was sacked as coach of New Zealand after their loss to South Sydney.

Round 7 

The Penrith vs South Sydney match was originally meant to be held at Campbelltown Stadium but was moved to Netstrata Jubilee Stadium due to concerns about the playing surface at Campbelltown.
The Storm vs Warriors match was originally meant to be held at AAMI Park but was moved to Netstrata Jubilee Stadium due to the high numbers of COVID-19 cases in Victoria compared to NSW & Queensland.
The Wests Tigers played their 500th NRL game in their match against Canterbury.

Round 8 

As of this round with the exception of Melbourne and New Zealand, all clubs were allowed to play at their home grounds again.
Addin Fonua-Blake was sent off in Manly's game against Newcastle.

Round 9 

Matt Ikuvalu became the first Sydney Roosters player to score 5 tries in a game since 1955.
Charlie Staines became the first player to score four tries on debut since 2008.
Dean Pay resigned as Canterbury Bulldogs coach after Canterbury's loss to the Brisbane Broncos.

Round 10 

The Wests Tigers recorded their biggest win since round 21, 2008.
Paul Green stepped down as Cowboys coach following their loss to the Penrith Panthers.

Round 11

Round 12

Round 13 

Des Hasler coached his 400th NRL game in Manly's loss to New Zealand.
Jason Demetriou, who is slated to take over from Wayne Bennett as head coach of the South Sydney Rabbitohs at the end of the 2021 NRL season, made his coaching debut for the Rabbitohs in this round after Bennett was stood down for breaching the NRL's COVID-19 protocols.
Anthony Seibold coached his last game for the Brisbane Broncos as he went into self isolation after the Brisbane's game against Souths in accordance with the Queensland Government's COVID regulations as he delayed his return to Queensland for family reasons. He would resign as coach after coming out of isolation.
Gold Coast ended a 10-game losing streak against North Queensland, which was their longest losing steak against any side to date.

Round 14 

Penrith won 9 matches in a row for the first time in their history.
Paul McGregor coached his last game for St George Illawarra after announcing his departure in the lead up to their game against Parramatta.
Kevin Proctor was sent off in his 250th NRL game.

Round 15 

Trent Robinson coached his 200th NRL game.
South Sydney recorded their biggest ever win over Manly with the latter recording their biggest loss since round 24, 2005 which was also the last time a Des Hasler coached side conceded 50 points in a match.
North Queensland were kept scoreless for the first time since Round 1, 2012.

Round 16

Round 17 

 Chad Townsend was sent off for a shoulder charge in Cronulla's 28 point loss against Newcastle

Round 18 

Adam Gee succumbed to a calf injury at half time and had to be replaced by stand-by referee Matt Cecchin for the second half.
The Gold Coast Titans defeated the Brisbane Broncos twice in a season and in consecutive matches for the first time in the history of any Gold Coast club.

Round 19 

The Panthers secured their first minor premiership since 2003 by defeating North Queensland.
Matt Noyen received a calf injury in the 12th minute of the Sea Eagles vs Titans game. He was replaced by Dave Munro in the 14th minute. Noyen did not return.
The Melbourne Storm played their 600th NRL match.

Round 20 

In the lead-up to Round 20, the Australian Rugby League Commission approved a number of experimental rule changes to be trialled in two matches during the final round of the regular season. The Commission approved the following experimental rules to be trialled in the Brisbane Broncos v North Queensland Cowboys game on Thursday night and the New Zealand Warriors v Manly Sea Eagles game on Sunday afternoon. Neither match will have an impact on the Top 8. The experimental rule changes are:
 Use of the “Six Again” rule for 10 metre infringements.
 Handover for kicks into touch rather than a scrum.
 Nominated Forwards only in the scrum.
 Change in Bunker referral process to reduce stoppages.
The Brisbane Broncos claimed their first wooden spoon after losing to the North Queensland Cowboys 32–16. It was their eleventh consecutive defeat to finish the season.
South Sydney scored 60 points in a game for the first time since 1937 and recorded their biggest ever win over the Sydney Roosters in the process.

Finals series

Chart

Grand Final

Notes 
aFrom round 2 to round 4, all matches were played behind closed doors due to the COVID-19 pandemic.

References

2020 NRL season